FGU may refer to:
 Collegedale Municipal Airport, in Tennessee, United States
 Fangatau Airport, in French Polynesia
 Fantasy Games Unlimited, a game publisher
 Fo Guang University, a university in Yilan County, Taiwan
 Franco-German University, an international education organisation
 French Guiana, UNDP code